John "Jack" Kirkaldy (1858 – 10 November 1907) was a Scottish professional golfer who played in the late 19th century. Kirkaldy tied for third place in the 1882 Open Championship and placed eighth and T9 in the 1879 and 1884 Open Championships, respectively. His younger brothers Andrew and Hugh were also professional golfers.

Early life 
Born in St Andrews in 1858, Kirkaldy took naturally to golf as a boy. As a young professional he was posted at Alexandra Park in Glasgow for a time. He also worked in Cannes, France, where he was a noted instructor of golf. He favorite club was the cleek, and he sometimes played with only that club against competitors with a full complement of clubs.

1882 Open Championship

Details of play 
The 1882 Open Championship was the 22nd Open Championship, held 30 September at the Old Course at St Andrews, Fife, Scotland. Bob Ferguson won the Championship for the third successive time, by three strokes from Willie Fernie. Kirkaldy had rounds of 86-89=175 and won £6 in prize money.

Ferguson led after the morning round with an 83. Going out in 40 he started back 4-3-4 and with some steady play came back in 43, despite a six at the 16th. Fitz Boothby, a local amateur, scored 86 despite a couple of sevens in the closing holes. He shared second place with Jack Kirkaldy with Jamie Anderson and Tom Kidd on 87.
Boothby scored 89 in the second round and took an early lead on 175. Anderson and Bob Martin, playing together, each had good rounds and they also both finished on 175. Ferguson again played steadily, going out in 42. Starting home he continued to score well and, despite a few sixes on his card, he avoided major disasters and finished with an 88 and a total of 171. The best of the later starters was Fernie. Despite starting with a six he was out in 40 and finished in 86 for a total of 174, good enough for second place.

Ferguson's win was his third in succession, once on each of the Championship courses, matching the achievement of Anderson from 1877 to 1879. His £12 first prize was a record for the Open at that time.

Death 
Kirkaldy died on 10 November 1907 in St Andrews, Scotland.

Results in The Open Championship 

Note: Kirkaldy played only in The Open Championship.

DNP = Did not play
CUT = missed the half-way cut
"T" indicates a tie for a place
Yellow background for top-10

Team appearances 
England–Scotland Professional Match (representing Scotland): 1905 (tie), 1906

References 

Scottish male golfers
Golfers from St Andrews
1858 births
1907 deaths